"Marjane, Marjane" (lit. "Marjan, Marjan") is a Croatian song from Dalmatia. The name refers to the Marjan hill which overlooks the largest city of Dalmatia, Split, and on which the main (large) city flag is raised.  It originates from a folk song sung in the city during the late 1930s, which was first recorded by the poet Ivo Tijardović. Its melody was also used for the Slovenian patriotic song Janez, kranjski Janez (John, John of Carniola).

During World War II the song (with somewhat expanded wording) became very popular among the Yugoslav Partisans. The original song was  played on the radio of the Nazi-puppet Independent State of Croatia, the Croatian Radio (Hrvatski krugoval). The original lyrics serve as the official festive song of the city of Split.  The song, being traditional, does not have a strictly defined ending, so its ending has changed through time and ideologies. Numerous artists have recorded the song. Najbolji Hrvatski Tamburaši included it in their 1989 release Hrvatska pjesmarica. Trio Gušt released a version with new lyrics in 2009.

Original (core) lyrics

Historical full versions

Partisan version

In later versions, from the beginning of the Informbiro period until the Tito–Stalin split in 1948, the stanza with the reference to Stalin was no longer popular and became used less and less. It was revived in the 1970s nationalist version, with "Jesus" replacing "Stalin" in the wording. The first two stanzas of this version are featured in the Academy Award-nominated motion picture The Battle of Neretva.

Contemporary version

This is the version more widely known in post-1989 Croatia. One of its first large scale performances was on May 30, 1990 by the Croatian singer Duško Lokin. It is often sung by Torcida, the supporters of the Split football club, HNK Hajduk.

See also 
 Marjan
 Split
 Dalmatia
 Ivo Tijardović
 Croatia
 Music of Croatia
 Flags of Croatia
 History of Croatia

References

External links
Marjane, Marjane lyrics at Cro Music 

Croatian folk songs
Split, Croatia